Gəgəli (also, Gegele, Gegeli, and Gyagyali) is 
a village and the most populous municipality, except for Agsu, in the Agsu Rayon of Azerbaijan.  It has a population of 3,502.

References 

Populated places in Agsu District